The Emirates Lunar Mission is the first mission to the Moon from the United Arab Emirates.

The mission by Mohammed bin Rashid Space Centre (MBRSC) is sending a lunar rover named Rashid to the Moon aboard ispace's Hakuto-R Mission 1 lander. It was launched on 11 December 2022 on a Falcon 9 Block 5 rocket, and the rover will land in Atlas crater.

Rashid will be equipped with two high-resolution cameras, a microscopic camera to capture small details, and a thermal imaging camera. The rover will also carry a Langmuir probe, designed to study the Moon's plasma and will attempt to explain why Moon dust is so sticky. The rover will study the lunar surface, mobility on the Moon’s surface and how different surfaces interact with lunar particles.

Overview
The mission's initial timeline was to send the rover by 2024. On 14 April 2021, MBRSC announced that the schedule had been moved up to send the rover to the Moon by 2022, rather than 2024. The rover is named Rashid in honor of Dubai's late ruler Sheikh Rashid bin Saeed Al Maktoum, who was responsible for the transformation of Dubai from a small cluster of settlements near the Dubai Creek to a modern port city and commercial hub. The rover will be built in MBRSC in Dubai by Emiratis, making it the first Arab country to send a mission to the Moon.

HAKUTO-R lander
As the United Arab Emirates does not plan to build its own lander, it has contracted with the Japanese company ispace for a lunar landing. The Emirates Lunar Mission will be the first Moon trip for Hakuto-R, which ispace has been developing for more than a decade. The company, which was established in 2010, managed Team Hakuto, one of the five finalists in the Google Lunar X Prize. The private race to the Moon ended in 2018 without a winner.

References

Space probes launched in 2022
2022 in the United Arab Emirates
Space program of the United Arab Emirates
Missions to the Moon
Lunar rovers